Ride in the Whirlwind is a 1966 American Western film starring Cameron Mitchell, Millie Perkins, Jack Nicholson, and Harry Dean Stanton, and directed by Monte Hellman. Nicholson also wrote and co-produced the film. A trio of cowboys are forced to become outlaws due to a case of mistaken identity by the local authorities.

Plot 
A gang of outlaws led by Blind Dick (Harry Dean Stanton) stop a stagecoach, remove a man and hang him. Another trio of cowboys,  Vern (Cameron Mitchell), Wes (Jack Nicholson) and Otis (Tom Filer), come upon the hanged man but nonetheless stop to rest for the night at the gang's remote hideout. Neither group of men trusts the other. In the morning, they all find themselves surrounded by a vigilante hanging party, and a shoot out ensues. The outlaws are burned out of their shed and Blind Dick and Indian Joe are hanged by the vigilante posse. Of the trio Otis is shot and the other two are forced to flee and become fugitives in a case of mistaken identity, as they are thought to be part of the original gang.

Vern and Wes take refuge at a farm belonging to Evan (George Mitchell), who lives alone with his wife and daughter. Although innocent and not villains, the two hold the family hostage until they can make an escape. After a member of the vigilantes passes by and questions Evan, the two try to escape taking Evan's horses. Evan shoots and wounds Vern, and Wes shoots and kills Evan. Wes and Vern ride off together on one horse with the posse in pursuit. Eventually Vern can go no further and falls off the horse. Dying, he tells Wes to ride off alone, and holds off the posse until Wes can ride to safety.

Cast

Production 
Hellman said that Roger Corman had agreed to put up funds for a Hellman-directed western at a lunch meeting at the old Brown Derby on Vine Street, just south of Hollywood Boulevard, one of a small chain of famous restaurants in Los Angeles (the famous hat-shaped location was on Wilshire Boulevard). By the end of the lunch, Corman had allowed that since Hellman was making one western, he might as well make two – presumably because, in the mind of the budget-conscious Corman, this would allow them to make two films for less than the usual cost.

The films were made back-to-back, with The Shooting in production first. Hellman said that the crew and some cast members stayed on location, and, after taking a week's break, they began filming Ride in the Whirlwind. However, other than travel costs, shooting the two films back-to-back did not result in appreciable savings. Hellman stated that both films were made for under US$75,000 each (approximate total of $150,000 for two, provided by Roger Corman). Hellman and Jack Nicholson, who produced, wrote, and acted in Ride in the Whirlwind, and had a smaller role in The Shooting, had agreed that if they went over budget on either film, they would pay the overage out of their own pockets. Thus they were very careful to keep within the budget for each.

The films were shot in Eastman Color in Utah, in an area that has since been filled in with an artificial lake. Parts of the film were shot in Kanab Canyon, Calvin Johnson Ranch, Paria, and Glen Canyon in Utah. Hellman said that producers would sometimes hire him to find out where he had shot the films, then fire him once they knew. He stated that he was the last to film there because it was filled with water soon after. Both Ride in the Whirlwind and The Shooting feature the same reddish low mountains with white lines in the rock (possibly water marks from a past age when the area was a sea or lake).

Hellman said that he tended to cut out as much dialogue as he could. He preferred to tell the story visually. He avoided the obvious in terms of dialogue. Hellman stated that he oversaw the daily progress by the writers of the two films – and that they rented an office in the Writer's Building in Beverly Hills on little Santa Monica Blvd. One personal thrill for Hellman was that their rented office was next door to Fred Astaire's.

Distribution 
Hellman stated that both films were sold to a distributor who then sold them as part of a larger package of films to be shown on television. The films did play theatrically in France in 1969 and Hellman said they were hits, with The Shooting playing for a year in Paris and Ride in the Whirlwind playing for six months. Hellman stated that in the late sixties it meant a lot in Hollywood to be lionized in France and thus Hellman had a brief time of being very much in demand in Hollywood.

Thematic similarities 
Both films involve a hunt. In the case of The Shooting, Nicholson is a hired gun and Warren Oates is a bounty hunter. Both men are working for a woman who is tracking someone. The entire film and the suspense is largely based on this mysterious hunt. In Ride in the Whirlwind, a posse that began by tracking a gang who robbed a stagecoach end up hunting down the Nicholson character and another man. Both films are considered acid westerns that express a rather bleak, minimalist quality that does not sentimentalize the Wild West. On the other hand, the violence is portrayed less graphically than, say, in the films of Sam Peckinpah like Pat Garrett and Billy the Kid.

See also 
 List of American films of 1965

References

External links 
 
 
 
 
The Shooting and Ride in the Whirlwind: We Can Bring a Good Bit of Rope an essay by Michael Atkinson at the Criterion Collection

1966 films
Films directed by Monte Hellman
1966 Western (genre) films
American Western (genre) films
Films with screenplays by Jack Nicholson
Films shot in Utah
Revisionist Western (genre) films
1960s English-language films
1960s American films